Hadhabani (also: Hadhbani) was a large medieval Sunni Muslim Kurdish tribe divided into several groups, centered at Arbil, Oshnavieh and Urmia. Their dominion included surrounding areas of Maragha and Urmia to the east, Salmas to the north and parts of Arbil and Mosul to the west ruling between the year 906 to 1080. 

About 10th century they gradually immigrated northward to the areas around Lake Urmia with Ushnu as their summer capital. They ruled the area for a while but later split to a few branches who spread across Azerbaijan, and Caucasus. Saladin, the renowned Kurdish Muslim ruler was descendant of one of the Hadhabani branches.

Rulers
Muhammad son of  Bilal, around 906 came in conflicts with Abbasids, eventually retired to Azarbaijan.
Jafar son of Shakkoya around 943, Salmas,
Mir Abu Hija Musk son of  Chako
Abu Hidja son of  Rabib al Dawla c. 1040 Urmia,
Mir Sharraf al-Din Isa son of  Musk c. 1045
Mir Salar son of Musa c. 1046
Mir Abul Hasan Ali son of Musk c. 1046–48
Mir Abu Ali al al-Hasan son of Musk 1048–63
Mir Abu Hija II, Husain son of Abi Ali Al-Hasan 1063-1080

See also
Kurds
List of Sunni Muslim dynasties
List of Kurdish dynasties and countries

References

External links
Sample of a Hadhabani coin

History of Kurdistan
Kurdish tribes